Postsecularism refers to a range of theories regarding the persistence or resurgence of religious beliefs or practices in the present. The "post-" may refer to after the end of secularism or after the beginning of secularism.

Use 

The term “postsecular” has been used in sociology, political theory, religious studies, art studies, literary studies, education and other fields. Jürgen Habermas is widely credited for popularizing the term, to refer to current times in which the idea of modernity is perceived as failing and, at times, morally unsuccessful, so that, rather than a stratification or separation, a new peaceful dialogue and tolerant coexistence between the spheres of faith and reason must be sought in order to learn mutually. In this sense, Habermas insists that both religious people and secularist people should not exclude each other, but to learn from one another and coexist tolerantly. Massimo Rosati says that in a post secular society, religious and secular perspectives are on even ground, meaning that the two theoretically share equal importance. Modern societies that have considered themselves fully secular until recently have to change their value systems accordingly as to properly accommodate this co-existence.

Charles Taylor’s A Secular Age is also frequently invoked as describing the postsecular, though there is sometimes disagreement over what each author meant with the term. Particularly contested is the question of whether “postsecular” refers to a new sociological phenomenon or to a new awareness of an existing phenomenon—that is, whether society was secular and now is becoming post-secular or whether society was never and is not now becoming secular even though many people had thought it was or thought it was going to be. Some suggest that the term is so conflicted as to be of little use. Others suggest that the flexibility of the term is one of its strengths.

In literary studies, the term has been used to indicate a sort of postmodern religious or spiritual sensibility in certain contemporary texts.

Related concept of desecularization 

The term "desecularization" appears in the title of Peter L. Berger's seminal work The Desecularization of the World: Resurgent Religion and World Politics. 

Berger explains that the assumption that the modern world is secular has been “falsified." Specifically, Berger maintained that "the assumption we live in a secularized world is false.... The world today is as furiously religious as it ever was."

See also

 Habermas' religious dialogue
 Church renewal
 Great Awakening
 Islamic revival and Islamization
 Islamism
 Neopaganism
 New Age
 New Atheism 
 New Thought
 Postmodern religion
 Post-postmodernism
 Religious naturalism
 Secular religion
 Spiritual naturalism
 Transhumanism

Further reading
 Abeysekara, Ananda. The Politics of Postsecular Religion: Mourning Secular Futures (Columbia University Press, 2008).
 Ratti, Manav. The Postsecular Imagination: Postcolonialism, Religion, and Literature (London and New York: Routledge, 2013).
 During, Simon.  "Toward the Postsecular". PMLA: Publications of the Modern Language Association of America: 120.3 (2005 May), pp. 876–77.
 Agar, Jolyon. Post-Secularism, Realism and Utopia: Transcendence and Immanence from Hegel to Bloch (London and New York: Routledge, 2014).
 McClure, John A..  Partial Faiths: Postsecular Fiction in the Age of Pynchon and Morrison. Athens, GA: U of Georgia P, 2007. xi, 209 pp.
 Bracke, Sarah. "Conjugating the Modern- Religious, Conceptualizing Female Religious Agency: Contours of a 'Post-secular' Conjuncture". Theory, culture & society. 25 (2008), p. 51-68.
 Braidotti, Rosi. "In Spite of the Times: The Postsecular Turn in Feminism" Theory, culture & society. 25 (2008), p. 1-24.
 Jean-Marc Ferry La Raison et la foi, Pocket, Paris, 2016.
 Habermas, Jürgen. "Secularism's Crisis of Faith: Notes on Post-Secular Society". New perspectives quarterly. vol. 25 (2008) p. 17-29.
 Josephson, Jason Ānanda. The Invention of Religion in Japan (Chicago: University of Chicago Press, 2012) (has a chapter on the "Shinto Secular" which is a discussion of postsecularism).
 Jusova, Iveta. "European Immigration and Continental Feminism: Theories of Rosi Braidotti." Feminist Theory 12:1 (Spring 2011).
 Koehrsen, Jens. "How religious is the public sphere? – A critical stance on the debate about public religion and post-secularity." Acta Sociologica. 55 (2012), p. 273-288. 
 Morozov, Aleksandr. "Has the Postsecular Age Begun?". Religion, state & society. 36 (2008) p. 39-44.
 Roberts, Michael Symmons. "Poetry In A Post-Secular Age". Poetry review. vol. 98 (London, 2008), p. 69-75
 Vries, Hent de; Sullivan, Lawrence E.; Ward, Ian. "Political Theologies: Public Religions in a Post-Secular World". Journal of church and state 17.50 (2008) p. 150-151
 Ferrara, Alessandro. "The separation of religion and politics in a post-secular society". Philosophy & social criticism. 35. (2009), p. 77-92.
 John R. Betz. After Enlightenment: The post-secular vision of J.G. Hamann (Oxford: Wiley-Blackwell Pub, 2009).
 Parmaksız, Umut. "Making Sense of the Postsecular". European Journal of Social Theory. December 15, 2016. DOI: 10.1177/1368431016682743

References

External links 

Secularism
Religion and politics
Sociology of religion
Political philosophy